Chharra Assembly constituency is one of the 403 constituencies of the Uttar Pradesh Legislative Assembly, India. It is a part of the Aligarh district and one of the five assembly constituencies in the Hathras Lok Sabha constituency. First election in this assembly constituency was held in 2012 after the "Delimitation of Parliamentary and Assembly Constituencies Order, 2008" was passed and the constituency was formed in 2008. The constituency is assigned identification number 74.

Wards / Areas
Extent of Chharra Assembly constituency is KC Chharra, PCs Barala, Dilalpur Sunhera, Nausha, Arni of Barala KC & Chharra NP of Atrauli Tehsil; KCs Akarabad, Vijaygarh, PCs Sidhauli, Asadpur Kiam, Grusikharan, Shahajahanpur Tajpur, Ekari, Changari, Imlani, Budhansi, Jalali-II, Alahdadpur, Bhojpur of Jalali KC, Jalali NP, Pilkhana NP, Kodiaganj NP & Vijaygarh NP of Koil Tehsil.

Members of the Legislative Assembly

Election results

2022

2012

See also
Aligarh district
Hathras Lok Sabha constituency
Sixteenth Legislative Assembly of Uttar Pradesh
Uttar Pradesh Legislative Assembly

References

External links
 

Politics of Aligarh district
Assembly constituencies of Uttar Pradesh
Constituencies established in 2008